The European Handball Federation (EHF) is the umbrella organisation for European handball.  Founded on 17 November 1991, it is made of 50 member federations and two associated federations (England and Scotland), and is headquartered in Vienna, Austria.

History
EHF was founded on 17 November 1991 in Berlin, Germany, although the first EHF Congress convened on 5 June 1992 and assigned EHF's headquarters to Vienna, Austria from 1 September that year.

In 2012 the EHF Office celebrated 20 years since it first opened its doors. In the subsequent years, the number of member countries has expanded from the initial 29 to its current number of 50, after Kosovo was granted full membership at the EHF Congress in Dublin, Ireland in September 2014. The EHF represents its members in the development of the sport both in terms of grassroots talent, as well as commercial growth.  EHF-organised events such as the Men's and Women's European Handball Championships and the EHF Champions League represent major revenue contributors, while initiatives such as beach handball and handball at school expand the attraction of the sport.

After-effects of Russian invasion of Ukraine
After Russia launched the 2022 Russian invasion of Ukraine, the European Handball Federation in February 2022 suspended Russia and Belarus both in competitions for national teams and on club level. It suspended the national teams of Russia and Belarus as well as Russian and Belarusian clubs competing in European handball competitions. Referees, officials, and commission members from Russia and Belarus will not be called upon for future activities. And new organisers will be sought for the YAC 16 EHF Beach Handball EURO and the Qualifier Tournaments for the Beach Handball EURO 2023, which were to be held in Moscow. In addition, it refused to allow competitions to be held in Russia or Belarus. The Russian Handball Federation failed in its appeal against the decision to exclude Russia's teams from continental competition, which was rejected by the European Handball Federation Court of Handball.

Presidents

Secretary Generals

Executive committee
Following is the EHF Executive Committee for the term 2021 – 2025.

Competitions
Results History:

European championships
European Men's Handball Championship
EHF Euro Cup (Since 2020)
European Women's Handball Championship
European Men's U-20 Handball Championship
European Women's U-19 Handball Championship
European Men's U-18 Handball Championship
European Women's U-17 Handball Championship
European Open Handball Championship
European Men's Beach Handball Championship
European Women's Beach Handball Championship
EHF Challenge Trophy
European Beach Handball Championship
European Beach Handball Tour
European U19 Beach Handball Championship
European U17 Beach Handball Championship
European Handball Men's 19 EHF Championship
European Handball Women's 19 EHF Championship
EHF Trophy
Women's Handball European Challenge Championships
Men's Handball European Challenge Championships
EHF Nations' Cup – Defunct

Multi-sports events
European Youth Olympic Festival

Men's club competitions
EHF Champions League
EHF European League (former EHF Cup)
EHF Cup Winners' Cup (merged with the EHF Cup from the 2012–13 season)
EHF European Cup (former EHF Challenge Cup and City Cup)
European Beach Handball Tour
EHF Beach Handball Champions Cup

Women's club competitions
Women's EHF Champions League
Women's EHF European League (former Women's EHF Cup)
Women's EHF Cup Winners' Cup (merged with the Women's EHF Cup from the 2016–17 season)
Women's EHF European Cup (former Women's EHF Challenge Cup and City Cup)
European Beach Handball Tour
EHF Beach Handball Champions Cup

Current title holders

Handball

Beach handball

Wheelchair handball

Club

Affiliated Members

 Albania
 Andorra
 Armenia
 Austria
 Azerbaijan
 Belarus (suspended)
 Belgium
 Bosnia and Herzegovina	
 Bulgaria
 Croatia
 Cyprus
 Czech Republic
 Denmark
 Estonia
 Faroe Islands
 Finland
 France
 Georgia
 Germany
 Great Britain
 Greece
 Hungary
 Iceland
 Ireland
 Israel
 Italy
 Kosovo
 Latvia
 Liechtenstein
 Lithuania
 Luxembourg
 Malta
 Moldova
 Monaco
 Montenegro
 Netherlands
 North Macedonia
 Norway
 Poland
 Portugal
 Romania
 Russia (suspended)
 Serbia
 Slovakia
 Slovenia
 Spain
 Sweden
 Switzerland
 Turkey
 Ukraine

Associated federations
 England
 Scotland

EHF European Championships
The European Men's Handball Championship and European Women's Handball Championship are the flagship national team events of the European Handball Federation and rank amongst the leading indoor sports events on the international sports market. First played in 1994, the EHF EUROs have taken place in host nations across the continent on a biennial basis, with the men's event held in January and the women's in December.

The Men's EHF EURO 2012, held in Serbia, attracted a cumulative global TV audience of 1.47 billion, and was transmitted by 75 broadcasters in more than 200 territories. A record 302,688 spectators also followed the event live in five venues across the countries.

The Men's EHF EURO 2014 in Denmark has set a new attendance record with 316,000 spectators.

The Women's EHF EURO 2014 in Hungary and Croatia achieved a cumulative audience of 723 million, which is the highest ever result for the championship. The result marks not only a 90 per cent increase on the 2012 edition (380 million), but also significantly tops the previous record set in 2006 (461 million). In terms of broadcast hours, the results were equally remarkable. With 1,919 broadcast hours, the tournament further confirmed its upward trend through an impressive 65 per cent climb of 758 hours compared to 2012. Overall, the tournament was aired in 145 countries.

EHF Champions League
The EHF Champions League was launched in the 1993–94 season for both men's and women's teams. The competition has developed considerably over the years, with the introduction of a distinctive blue lagoon and black floor in the 2007–08 season, the creation of an 'EHF Champions League' ball as well as changes to the format of the competition, which saw the introduction of a new 'Last 16' and the VELUX EHF FINAL4 in the 2009–10 season. From the start of the 2011–12 season, the VELUX Group added their name to the men's competition as title sponsor, and the competition became the VELUX EHF Champions League. The 20th jubilee season (2012–13) saw the launch of a brand new corporate identity and logo.
The women's competition also introduced the final tournament for the first time in the 2013–14 season and added the quarter-final stage in the following edition.

EHF European Cup competitions
Over 250 clubs take part in the EHF European Cup competitions, which include EHF European League and EHF European Cup. The 2012–13 season saw a change to the men's European Cup competitions with the amalgamation of the EHF Cup and the Cup Winners' Cup to become simply the 'EHF Cup'. The change was introduced in order to create a three-tier competition system with the VELUX EHF Champions League at the top, followed by the EHF Cup and then the Challenge Cup. The same merging is planned for the 2016–17 season in the women's competitions. The EHF administers over 730 European club matches each year, which take place in all corners of the continent.

Beach handball
Beach handball originated on the beaches of Italy in the 1990s and has established itself as a sport in its own right within the EHF with the organisation of the European Beach Tour and European Championships for men, women and younger age categories. The first European Beach Handball Championships were held in 2000 in Gaeta (Italy) and the most recent was held in Lloret de Mar (Spain) in the summer of 2015. Beach handball is a World Games sport, making its debut in 2009. It will also have its premiere at the 2018 Youth Olympic Games in Buenos Aires.

Development
The EHF has a number of projects and initiatives through which it supports the development of the sport generally and also in its member federations. These include:
 Rinck Convention: named after the EHF Honorary Member, and former chairman of the EHF Methods Commission, Claude Rinck. Its aim is the mutual recognition of standards and certificates in the field of coaches' education in handball in Europe by preserving and safeguarding the regional and national characteristics of coaches' education, in order to facilitate the direct admission to work as a handball coach, in each signatory member federation.
 SMART Projects: short-term projects in member federations with specific aims and objectives; includes material support, coaching and technical support.
 Foster Projects: cooperation agreements between federations; usually between top-ranking and emerging nations to support the progress of handball's development.
 Infrastructure Support Programme (ISP): Longer-term projects in partnership with member federations; offering part-funding of salaries of staff members, such as development officers to help build capacity in member federations.

Dress code rules
This has led to claims of sexism within the organization from several people, including Norwegian Member of Parliament Lene Westgaard-Halle. The EHF released a statement saying that "The EHF is committed to bring this topic forward in the interest of its member federations, however it must also be said that a change of the rules can only happen at IHF level".

References

External links

 
+Europe
International organisations based in Vienna
National members of the International Handball Federation
Han
Sports organizations established in 1991
1991 establishments in Germany